Nathan Duane Brown (born May 4, 1979) is an American politician from West Virginia.

Early life and education
Nathan Brown was born on May 4, 1979 in South Williamson, Kentucky to parents Brock and Kelly Brown. Nathan graduated from Burch High School. Nathan earned an Accounting degree from the University of Pikeville, an MBA from the University of Charleston, and a J.D. from Appalachian School of Law.

Career
Brown is a private attorney as well as an assistant prosecuting attorney and the attorney of Williamson, West Virginia. In 2012, Brown ran for the West Virginia House of Delegates seat representing the 20th district, but was defeated in the Democratic primary. On November 6, 2018, Brown was elected to the West Virginia House of Delegates, where he represented the 20th district from December 1, 2018 to December 1, 2022.

Personal life
Brown is married to Brandy, and together they have three children. Brown is Christian.

References

Living people
1979 births
Christians from West Virginia
People from Pike County, Kentucky
People from Williamson, West Virginia
Democratic Party members of the West Virginia House of Delegates
University of Charleston alumni
West Virginia lawyers
21st-century American lawyers
21st-century American politicians